Ağva is a populated place and resort destination in the Şile district of İstanbul Province, Turkey.

History
The area around Ağva was a part of ancient Bithynia. During the Ottoman era, Turkmen people were settled around Ağva. Up to 20th century, a sizable Greek population also dwelled in Ağva. However, according to population exchange between Greece and Turkey agreement in the 1920s, they were replaced by Turks from Greece.

Geography

Ağva is a coastal place at Black Sea, situated between two rivers,  Göksu in the west and Yeşilçay in the east. In fact, the name Ağva means "between the rivers". Yeşilçay is known one of the main source of İstanbul urban water system, the Yeşilçay Drinking Water Plant.

Living
With a picturesque scenery, Ağva is one of the popular resorts of İstanbul. In addition to the  beach  there are many boarding houses and restaurants. Göksu River is well known for boat excursions and the settlement became shooting place in a number of television serials.

Population of Ağva rises during the summers. The resort hosts around 15,000 people in the summer time. Up to 2009, Ağva was the seat of a township  being a municipality since 1992. After the local elections in 2009, it lost its town status due to decreased population below limit. It was declared a neighborhood of Şile district. Currently the population is 1998.

Economy
Thanks to woodlands around the settlement, Ağva was known as Istanbul's main source for charcoal up to the 1950s. Today, tourism plays an important role in addition to weaving of Şile cloth at hand looms and cultivation of vegetables and fruit.

See also
 Yeşilçay Drinking Water Plant

References

Seaside resorts in Turkey
Populated coastal places in Turkey
Turkey
Şile